The E-mount is a lens mount designed by Sony for their NEX ("New E-mount eXperience") and ILCE series of camcorders and mirrorless cameras. The E-mount supplements Sony's α mount, allowing the company to develop more compact imaging devices while maintaining compatibility with 35mm sensors. E-mount achieves this by:
 Minimising mechanical complexity, removing mechanical aperture and focus drive.
 Shortening the flange focal distance to 18 mm compared with earlier offerings from Sony which used 44.5 mm.
 Reducing the radius of the flange.
The short flange focal distance prohibits the use of an optical viewfinder, as a mirror box mechanism cannot be included in this reduced distance. Therefore all E-mount cameras use an electronic viewfinder.

History
Initially, E-mount was implemented on the Sony α NEX-3 and NEX-5 consumer-targeted devices with APS-C sized sensors. E-mount integration into Sony camcorder products was provided with the Sony Handycam NEX-VG10. On 24 August 2011, new products were announced, specifically the NEX-5N as a successor for the NEX-5, and the NEX-7 as a prosumer product, as well as the NEX-VG20 as the successor to the NEX-VG10. The Sony E-mount was brought to the 35 mm video camera market with the Sony NEX-FS100.

The first third-party camera to use the E-mount was the Hasselblad Lunar, announced at Photokina on 18 September 2012 and released in early 2013.

In September 2013, Sony announced the first model from new ILCE series, the Sony α3000. In October 2013, the first models with full-frame sensor size were released, the Sony α7 and Sony α7R. On 19 April 2017, Sony revealed their new model Model ILCE-9, the Sony α9, characterized as a professional mirrorless camera system.

In September 2017, Sony revealed its VENICE high-end digital cinema camera, which records in 6K 16-bit raw format.

Available bodies
List of Sony E-mount cameras:

Available lenses

Third-party lens manufacturers

On 8 February 2011, Sony announced the release of the specifications for the E-mount lens system, allowing for third-party lens makers to create lenses for NEX cameras without having to pay royalties. The mount specifications have been released to registered parties since April 2011. Getting a license for the specifications requires approval by Sony and the signing of a non-disclosure agreement.

The construction of full-frame manual focus prime lenses without any electronics is relatively easier and less costly than the construction of electronic full-frame autofocus lenses of any kind. This has encouraged lesser known lens companies to construct full-frame prime lenses with an E-mount. Numerous affordable sharp full-format manual prime lenses with big apertures are available with an E-mount.

List of manufacturers of third-party lenses

 Yongnuo
 7Artisans
 Anhui ChangGeng Optical Technology Company
 AstrHori
 Carl Zeiss AG
 Cosina Co., Ltd.
 Handevision
 Irix Lens
 Samyang Optics / Rokinon
 Sigma Corporation
 Shenyang Zhongyi Optical and Electronic Company (ZY Optics)
 Shenzhen Neewer
 SLR Magic
 Tamron Co., Ltd.
 Tokina
 TTArtisan
 Venus Optics
 Viltrox
 Voigtländer
 Yasuhara
 Zunow

Adapting lenses to Sony E-mount

Due to the short flange focal distance of the Sony E-mount, many lenses can be adapted to be used on the Sony E-mount, although a crop factor will have to be taken into account for all cameras with APS-C or Super-35mm sensor format. Additionally, with the introduction of in-camera image stabilization to Sony's newer mirrorless cameras, any adapted lens (regardless of age, brand, or lens mount) can be image stabilized.

Nearly all manual lenses can be attached with simple ring-like adapters to Sony's mirrorless cameras, such as for Canon FD, Minolta MC/MD, Leica M, and many others. Manual focus lenses that transmit Exif data will require an adapter with electronic contacts, which are generally more expensive to produce.

Adapting autofocus lenses to Sony's older E-mount cameras (such as the Sony α6000 and α7) can often be ineffective due to the inability of the camera body to effectively lock-on to a subject, resulting in either hunting or missed focus. This has largely been remedied in recent years with improved lens adapter performance, as well as the introduction of faster, more accurate autofocusing systems to Sony's more recent cameras (such as the Sony α6500 and Sony α9).

Sony LA-EA adapters

Most A-mount lenses can be used via the Sony LA-EA1, LA-EA2, LA-EA3, LA-EA4, or LA-EA5 mount adapters, which provide electronic contacts and mechanical aperture control. They allow the camera body to control the aperture of the lens and provide automatic exposure and Exif data support.

 LA-EA1: APS-C format only; originally only a autoexposure adapter, but a firmware update allows it to autofocus lenses with AF motors (SSM and SAM); most screw driven lenses can be used with manual focus
 LA-EA2: APS-C format only; supports phase-detection autofocus with most A-mount lenses. the translucent-mirror directs 30% of the light to the dedicated AF sensor.
LA-EA3: full-frame format compatible; autofocuses lenses with AF motors (SSM and SAM); most screw driven lenses can be used with manual focus 
 LA-EA4: full-frame format compatible; supports phase-detection autofocus with most A-mount lenses. the translucent-mirror directs 30% of the light to the dedicated AF sensor.
LA-EA5: full-frame format compatible; autofocuses most A-mount lenses; screw driven lenses only with newer camera bodies

Non Alpha mount Minolta lenses will not mount on these adapters. Alpha mount Power Zoom/Xi lenses are also not supported. The LA-EA2 and LA-EA4 adapters have fifteen phase-detect AF points, the center three points are cross type. Its tripod mount isn't detachable. During movie mode, the adapter doesn't permit the change of aperture. The translucent-mirror SLT design, which requires a pellicle mirror in the light path, causes 1/3 of the light to be reflected to the autofocus sensor. The 1/3 light fall-off equals 1/2 stop and may decrease the image quality accordingly when available light is a limiting factor.

Techart offers a unique autofocusing adapter, having a motor that moves the adapter flange along optical axis. It has Leica M-mount on the lens side, but via stacking additional adapter almost any SLR lens can be mounted.

Sony LA-EB adapters

Released at the end of 2019, this lens adapter allows for the mounting of a B4-mount-lens with electronic connection.

 LA-EB1: Super 16 format only

List of adaptable lens mounts

The following lens mounts can be used on the Sony E-mount with the use of various adapters available from third parties:
Alpha mount
Sony A-mount (Sony LA-EA1, LA-EA2, LA-EA3, LA-EA4, LA-EA5 with AF and electronic aperture control, 3rd part adapters with aperture ring)
BNCR mount
C-mount
Canon EF and Canon EF-S (Sigma MC-11 EF-E and other adapters with AF and electronic aperture control, "dumb" adapter variant with tilt available)
Canon FD
Contax G
Contax N
Contarex
Contax/Yashica (C/Y) bayonet (an adapter variant with tilt is also available)
Exakta lens mount
Fujica X bayonet
Hasselblad Xpan
Konica AR (bayonet)
Leica M-mount (bayonet) (adapter with back focusing AF available)
Leica M39 lens mount (LTM/L39) (screw)
Leica R-mount (adapter variant with tilt available)
M42-mount (screw) (adapter variant with tilt available)
Micro Four Thirds
Minolta SR-mount (MD/MC)
Minolta/Konica Minolta A-mount (Minolta/Konica Minolta AF/α/Dynax/Maxxum and Sony α DSLRs) (Sony LA-EA1, LA-EA2, LA-EA3, LA-EA4 with AF and electronic aperture control, and third-party adapters with aperture ring)
Nikon F-mount (with AF and electronic aperture control, adapter variant with aperture ring for G lenses available, adapter variant with tilt available)
Olympus OM-mount (adapter variant with tilt available)
Olympus Pen F
Pentax Auto 110
Pentax K-mount (adapter variant with aperture ring for DA lenses available)
PL mount
Rollei-mount
Sigma SA-mount (Sigma MC-11 SA-E with AF and electronic aperture control)
T2-mount (screw)

List of Sony E-mount adapters with a focal reducer
A focal reducer is a device which inserts between main lens and camera and shrinks image circle while simultaneously increasing the f-stop of the lens. The downside is that only lenses from other systems with longer flange distance are accepted. Native E-mount lenses are not supported.
 Metabones Speed Booster, from full-frame SLR to APS-C, 0.71x
 Metabones Speed Booster Ultra, from full-frame SLR to APS-C, 0.71x
 Zhongyi Lens Turbo, from full-from frame SLR to APS-C, 0.71x
 Kipon Baveyes Ultra 0.7x Adapter, from Medium Format SLR to Sony-E full-frame (announced 2016)
 Kipon Baveyes L/M-S/E 0.65x, from Leica M-mount to Sony APS-C (announced 2016)

Comparison with similar lens mounts

See also
List of Sony E-mount cameras
List of Sony E-mount lenses
List of third-party E-mount lenses

References

Lens mounts
 
Camera lenses introduced in 2010
Japanese inventions